.dz is the country code top-level domain (ccTLD) for Algeria (from , the local name for Algeria).

It is administered by the DZ Network Internet Center, a subdivision of CERIST (Centre de Recherche sur l'Information Scientifique et Technique). To apply for a .dz domain name, one must be an entity established in Algeria and/or having legal representation in Algeria and/or having a document justifying the name ownership rights in the country. Currently, NIC.DZ charges 1000 Algerian dinars per year for a domain (about US$).

Second-level domains
Registrations are taken directly at the second level, or at the third level beneath these names:

 .com.dz: Commercial entities
 .gov.dz: Governmental entities
 .org.dz: Entities appointing non-governmental and non-commercial organizations
 .edu.dz: Entities of education
 .asso.dz: Approved associations
 .pol.dz: Political parties
 .art.dz: Arts
 .net.dz: Network providers/operators and entities operating in other back-end internet services
 .tm.dz: Entities, residing abroad, which possess protected trademarks covered in Algeria and having no document justifying an activity or presence in Algeria.
 .soc.dz: Natural persons, residing in Algeria, who possess protected trademarks in Algeria and do not exercise a commercial activity (not having Algerian Trade certificate)

Second top-level domain
A second, internationalised top-level domain will be used for Algeria, intended for domain names in the local language, using Arabic characters: الجزائر. It was registered in 2011 and is represented as .xn--lgbbat1ad8j for the DNS name.

See also
 Internet in Algeria

References

External links
IANA .dz whois information
NIC.DZ
CERIST
Ministry of Posts and Telecommunications

Internet in Algeria
Mass media in Algeria
Country code top-level domains
Communications in Algeria
Council of European National Top Level Domain Registries members

sv:Toppdomän#D